The Dutch Championships in Artistic Gymnastics is an annual competition inviting Dutch gymnasts as well as others worldwide. It also serves as the National Championships for the Dutch gymnasts.

List

All-Around Champions 

In 2012, the National Championships were used to see who would be chosen to represent the Netherlands at the 2012 London Olympic Games, as they had not qualified a team and only had one representative. Céline van Gerner won the title of National Champion, and so she was chosen to represent the Netherlands.

Vault

Uneven Bars

Balance Beam

Floor Exercise

References

External links

Dutch
Gymnastics competitions in the Netherlands
Gymnastics